Megachile latericauda is a species of bee in the family Megachilidae. It was described by Theodore Dru Alison Cockerell in 1921.

References

Latericauda
Insects described in 1921